CNN is a Bosnian commercial television channel based in Sarajevo, Bosnia and Herzegovina. The program is mainly produced in Bosnian language. The TV station was established in 2012.

References

External links 
 Communications Regulatory Agency of Bosnia and Herzegovina
 (www.okanal.ba)

Television stations in Bosnia and Herzegovina
Television channels and stations established in 2012